These are the results for the mixed relay event at the 2018 Summer Youth Olympics.

Results

References
 Fencing ranking round Results
 Swimming Results 
 Fencing bonus round Results
 Laser Run Results
 Final Results

Modern pentathlon at the 2018 Summer Youth Olympics